Var (also Romanized as Vār) is a village in Firuraq Rural District of the Central District of Khoy County, West Azerbaijan province, Iran. At the 2006 National Census, its population was 4,271 in 781 households. The following census in 2011 counted 4,620 people in 1,263 households. The latest census in 2016 showed a population of 4,808 people in 1,446 households; it was the largest village in its rural district.

References 

Khoy County

Populated places in West Azerbaijan Province

Populated places in Khoy County